Ismail Diakhité (born 18 December 1991) is a Mauritanian professional footballer who plays as a forward for CS Sfaxien and the Mauritania national team.

International career
On 18 November 2018, Diakité scored the goal that qualified Mauritania to the 2019 Africa Cup of Nations for the first time ever, against Botswana in a 2–1 win.

Career statistics

International 

Scores and results list Mauritania's goal tally first, score column indicates score after each Diakhité goal.

References

External links 
 
 
 

1991 births
Living people
People from Nouakchott
Mauritanian footballers
Association football forwards
ASAC Concorde players
CS Hammam-Lif players
Al-Fayha FC players
Al-Nahda Club (Saudi Arabia) players
AS Marsa players
Khaleej FC players
Ittihad Tanger players
US Tataouine players
Al-Shamal SC players
CS Sfaxien players
Super D1 players
Tunisian Ligue Professionnelle 1 players
Saudi First Division League players
Saudi Professional League players
Botola players
Qatari Second Division players
Mauritanian expatriate footballers
Expatriate footballers in Tunisia
Expatriate footballers in Saudi Arabia
Expatriate footballers in Morocco
Expatriate footballers in Qatar
Mauritanian expatriate sportspeople in Tunisia
Mauritanian expatriate sportspeople in Saudi Arabia
Mauritanian expatriate sportspeople in Morocco
Mauritanian expatriate sportspeople in Qatar
Mauritania international footballers
2019 Africa Cup of Nations players